Pa Pong may refer to:

Pa Pong, Chiang Mai, Thailand
Pa Pong, Mae Hong Son, Thailand